The 1999 South American Youth Championship (Sudamericana sub-20) was a football competition contested by all ten national football teams of CONMEBOL. Each team was represented by the under-20 national football team. The tournament was held in Argentina between January 5 and January 25, 1999, the 23rd time the competition had been held.

Group A

Argentina
D.T. Jose Nestor Pekerman

Chile
D.T. Vladimir David Bigorra

Peru
D.T. Mario Gonzalez Benitez

Ecuador
D.T. Carlos Torres Garces

Venezuela
D.T. Richard Paez

Group B
D.T. Joao Carlos Da Silva Costa

Brazil

Uruguay
D.T. Victor Haroldo Pua

Paraguay
D.T.  Mario Cesar Jacquet

Colombia
D.T. Fernando Castro Lozada

Bolivia
D.T.  Eduardo Guliarte

References

South American U-20 Championship squads